Escaria is a genus of moths of the family Noctuidae.

Species
 Escaria clauda Grote, 1883
 Escaria homogena McDunnough, 1922

References
Natural History Museum Lepidoptera genus database
Escaria at funet

Hadeninae